Blacc may refer to:

Aloe Blacc (born 1979), American soul singer, rapper and musician
Blacc Plague, second studio album by American hip hop group Insane Poetry
Blacc Balled, debut album by rapper Lil' C-Style

See also

Black (disambiguation)